Frederick Fett (2 May 1886 – 27 August 1979) was an Australian cricketer. He played in two first-class matches for Queensland between 1909 and 1912.

See also
 List of Queensland first-class cricketers

References

External links
 

1886 births
1979 deaths
Australian cricketers
Queensland cricketers
Cricketers from Toowoomba